General elections were held in Dominica on 18 December 2009, to elect the 21 Representatives of the House of Assembly. The incumbent Dominica Labour Party increased its majority to 18 of 21 seats, winning a third term.

Results

By constituency

References

Elections in Dominica
Dominica
General
Dominica